Green Isle may refer to a community in the United States:

Green Isle, Minnesota
Green Isle Township, Sibley County, Minnesota

See also
Emerald Isle (disambiguation)